() is a historical title of the German nobility, usually translated as "count". Considered to be intermediate among noble ranks, the title is often treated as equivalent to the British title of "earl" (whose female version is "countess").

The German nobility was gradually divided into high and low nobility. The high nobility included those counts who ruled immediate imperial territories of "princely size and importance" for which they had a seat and vote in the Imperial Diet.

Etymology and origin
However, the Grimms preferred a solution that allows a connection to  'reeve', in which the ge- is a prefix, and which the Grimms derive from Proto-Germanic  'number'.

History

In Austria, its use is banned by law, as with all hereditary titles and nobiliary particles. In Switzerland, the title is not acknowledged in law. In the monarchies of Belgium, Liechtenstein and Luxembourg, where German is one of the official languages, the title continues to be recognised, used and, occasionally, granted by the national , the reigning monarch.

Although lacking the prestige and powers of the former Imperial counts, they remained legal members of the local nobility, entitled to whatever minor privileges were recognised at the ruler's court. The title, translated as "count", was generally accepted and used in other countries by custom.  

Many Continental counts in Germany and Austria were titled  without any additional qualification. Usually a hyphenated suffix indicated which of the familial lands a particular line of counts held, e.g. .

In the medieval Holy Roman Empire, some counts took or were granted unique variations of the  title, often relating to a specific domain or jurisdiction of responsibility, e.g.

Nobiliary titles containing the term 
Some are approximately of comital rank, some higher, some lower. The more important ones are treated in separate articles (follow the links); a few minor, rarer ones only in sections below.

A  was a nobleman whose title of count was conferred or confirmed by the Holy Roman Emperor, and meant "Imperial Count", i.e., a count of the Holy Roman Empire. Since the feudal era, any count whose territory lay within the Empire and was under the immediate jurisdiction of the Emperor with a shared vote in the  came to be considered a member of the "upper nobility" in Germany, along with princes, dukes, electors, and the emperor himself.

Such titles were purely honorific.

In English,  is usually translated simply as count and is combined with a territorial suffix (e.g., Count of Holland, Count Reuss) or a surname (Count Fugger, Count von Browne). Even after the abolition of the Holy Roman Empire in 1806, the  retained precedence above other counts in Germany. Those who had been quasi-sovereign until German mediatisation retained, until 1918, status and privileges pertaining to members of reigning dynasties.

Notable  have included:
 
 
 , a title merged into the imperial dignity
 
  since 26 September 1366 (previously, simply )
 
 
 Tyrol as a dominion of the Austrian crown

Margrave 

A  or Margrave was originally a military governor of a Carolingian "mark" (march), a border province. In medieval times the borders of the Holy Roman Empire were especially vulnerable to foreign attack, so the hereditary count of these "marches" of the realm was sometimes granted greater authority than other vassals to ensure security. They bore the title "margrave" until the few who survived as sovereigns assumed higher titles when the Empire was abolished in 1806. 

Since the abolition of the German Empire at the end of World War I, the heirs of some of its former monarchies have resumed use of margrave as a title of pretence, e.g.

Landgrave 

A  or Landgrave was a nobleman of comital rank in feudal Germany whose jurisdiction stretched over a territory larger than usually held by a count within the Holy Roman Empire. The status of a landgrave was elevated, usually being associated with suzerains who were subject to the Holy Roman Emperor but exercised sovereign authority within their lands and independence greater than the prerogatives to which a simple  was entitled, but the title itself implied no specific, legal privileges.

 occasionally continued in use as the subsidiary title of such minor royalty as the Elector of Hesse or the Grand Duke of Saxe-Weimar, who functioned as the Landgrave of Thuringia in the first decade of the 20th century.

The title is now borne by the hereditary heirs to the deposed monarchs of Hesse (Donatus, Landgrave of Hesse and Wilhelm, Landgrave of Hesse-Philippsthal-Barchfeld), who lost their throne in 1918.

A  is a  who was recognised by the Holy Roman Emperor as bearing the higher rank or exercising the more extensive authority of an Imperial prince. While nominally retaining only a comital title, he was accorded princely rank and, usually, arms by the Emperor.

Burgrave / Viscount 

A , or Burgrave, was a 12th- and 13th-century military and civil judicial governor of a castle (compare castellan, keeper) of the town it dominated and of its immediate surrounding countryside.

Over time the office and domain to which it was attached tended to become hereditary by Imperial grant or retention over generations by members of the same family.

Examples: Burgrave of Nuremberg, Burgrave of  

Some became hereditary and by the modern era obtained rank just below a count, though above a ' (baron) who might hold a fief as vassal of the original count.

Rhinegrave, Wildgrave, Raugrave, Altgrave

Unlike the other comital titles, Rhinegrave, Wildgrave (Waldgrave), Raugrave, and Altgrave are not generic titles. Rather, each is linked to a specific countship, whose unique title emerged during the course of its history. These unusually named countships were equivalent in rank to other Counts of the Empire who were of  status, being entitled to a shared seat and vote in the Imperial Diet and possessing Imperial immediacy, most of which would be mediatised upon dissolution of the Empire in 1806.

Their castle was known as the  Castle. After the Rhinegraves inherited the Wildgraviate (see below) and parts of the Countship of Salm, they called themselves Wild-and-Rhinegraves of Salm.
They were named after the geographic properties of their territories: Wildgrave after  ("forest"), and Raugrave after the rough (i.e. mountainous) terrain.
 The first Raugrave was Count  I (died 1172). The dynasty died out in the 18th century. Charles I Louis, Elector Palatine purchased the estates, and after 1667 accorded the wife and children of his arguably bigamous (morganatic) second marriage to Baroness , the title of "Raugravine/Raugrave".
 Altgrave ("old count") was a title used by the counts of Lower Salm to distinguish themselves from the Wild- and Rhinegraves of Upper Salm, since Lower Salm was the senior branch of the family.

In Scandinavia

Modern usage in German surnames
German nobility, although not abolished (unlike the Austrian nobility by the new First Austrian Republic in 1919), lost recognition as a legal class in Germany under the Weimar Republic in 1919 under the Weimar Constitution, article 109. Former hereditary noble titles legally simply transformed into dependent parts of the legal surname (with the former title thus now following the given name, e.g. ). Today, having lost their legal status, these terms are often not translated, unlike before 1919. The titles do, however, retain prestige in some circles of society.

Other uses

See also 
 German nobility
 History of Germany
 Holy Roman Emperor
 List of German monarchs
  (Holy Roman Empire)

Sources and references
(incomplete)
 WorldStatesmen: see every modern state; here Germany/Holy Roman Empire

External links 
 Lexikon article "Raugraf"

Austrian noble titles
 
German feudalism
German words and phrases
German noble titles